Martin E. Brooks (born Martin Baum; November 30, 1925 – December 7, 2015) was an American character actor known for playing scientist Rudy Wells in the television series The Six Million Dollar Man and its spin-off, The Bionic Woman, from 1975 onward (a role originally portrayed by Martin Balsam and then by Alan Oppenheimer).

Early life
Brooks was born Martin Baum in The Bronx. When he was 10, he moved with his family to Wilkes-Barre, Pennsylvania. After high school, he volunteered to serve in the U.S. Army, became a paratrooper with the 11th Airborne Division and was awarded a Purple Heart for injuries received during World War II. He attended Penn State University and enrolled at the Dramatic Workshop of the New School for Social Research in New York City. He won the off-Broadway best actor award for his performance in Outside the Door and changed his name to Martin Brooks, following the advice of producer Richard Rodgers.

Career

Acting

Theatre
In 1959, Brooks starred in Saul Levitt's hit play The Andersonville Trial with Brian Donlevy and Charles Durning. He was very proud of his theatre work that included An Enemy of the People and I Am a Camera, as well as the actors with whom he appeared, including Julie Harris and Barbara Bel Geddes. Brooks was also in John Steinbeck's Burning Bright as Victor with Kent Smith as Joe Saul, Barbara Bel Geddes as Mordeen, and Howard Da Silva as Friend Ed which he had adapted from his 1950 novel of the same name.

Television
In the 1950s, Brooks appeared in The Philco–Goodyear Television Playhouse.In the 1960s, he appeared in Combat!. In the 1972–73 TV season, he had a recurring role as Deputy D.A. Chapman in McMillan & Wife. In the fall of 1977, Brooks and Richard Anderson (as Oscar Goldman) became the first known actors to portray the same characters as regulars simultaneously on two different networks. NBC picked up The Bionic Woman after the series had been cancelled by ABC. ABC continued to air The Six Million Dollar Man. Brooks had, by that time, been promoted to series regular on both series. The unusual situation lasted only one season as the two series were cancelled by their respective networks in the spring of 1978.

Brooks reprised the role of Wells in three television movies: The Return of the Six-Million-Dollar Man and the Bionic Woman (1987), Bionic Showdown: The Six Million Dollar Man and the Bionic Woman (1989) and Bionic Ever After? (1994).  His other television roles include  in Mike Snow in Hunter, Arthur Bradshaw in General Hospital,  Car 54, Where Are You?, Gunsmoke (“The Lure”-1967), Mission: Impossible, Night Gallery, Love, American Style, The Mod Squad, and Edgar Randolph in the soap opera Dallas, in a story arc involving J.R. Ewing. Brooks also guest-starred in an episode of The Silent Force in 1970. He appeared in Knots Landing as Ted Burton in the 1990s.

Writing
Brooks wrote two novels: Danny Brown and Roman Candle. His play Flo and Joe was optioned for a Broadway production and received several workshop productions at the Actors Studio and at Theatre West.

Personal life and death
According to Jon Landau, Brooks was the "soulmate" of Landau's mother, Edie, for over 20 years. They were friends as children and reconnected in 1993 after her husband died. Brooks was friends with Charles Durning when they met in 1959 in Saul Levitt's hit play The Andersonville Trial until Durning's death in 2012.

Brooks died on December 7, 2015, of natural causes at his home in Studio City, Los Angeles, one week after his 90th birthday.

Awards and honors
Brooks won the Theatre World Award and the Donaldson Award for his role in Burning Bright.

Filmography

Film

Television

References

Notes

  Credited as Martin Brooks.
  Part of the Hallmark Hall of Fame series.
  Uncredited.
  Episodes were shown out of production order.
  Episode was rerun on July 6, 1960.

Citations

Sources

External links

Martin E. Brooks (Aveleyman)

1925 births
2015 deaths
People from the Bronx
20th-century American male actors
Male actors from New York City
People from Studio City, Los Angeles
United States Army personnel of World War II
American male soap opera actors
American male television actors
American male film actors
United States Army soldiers